Shokhin is a Russian masculine surname. Its feminine counterpart is Shokhina. Notable people with this last name include:
Alexander Shokhin (born 1951), Russian politician
Anna Shokhina (born 1997), Russian ice hockey player

See also
Shokin

Russian-language surnames